Kiasar (also Romanized as Kīāsar) is a village in Asara Rural District, Asara District, Karaj County, Alborz Province, Iran. At the 2006 census, its population was 87, in 31 families.

References 

Populated places in Karaj County